Santry is a suburb on the Northside of Dublin, Ireland.

Santry may also refer to:

 Santry (surname)
 Santry Court or Santry Desmsne a public park located in Dublin, Ireland
 Santry River, a small river on the north side of Dublin
 Santry Stadium or Morton Stadium an athletics stadium located in Santry, on the north of Dublin